A grass valley (also vega and valle) is a meadow located within a forested and relatively small drainage basin such as  a headwater.  Grass valleys are common in North America, where they are created and maintained principally by the work of beavers or browsers feeders.  Rarely, they are associated with cienegas.

The words vega and valle are loanwords from Spanish.

Notable examples
Valles Caldera, New Mexico
Las Vegas Springs Preserve, Nevada

See also

Rincon (meadow)

Wetlands
Fluvial landforms